The 2001 NCAA Division I Women's Tennis Championships were the 20th annual championships to determine the national champions of NCAA Division I women's singles, doubles, and team collegiate tennis in the United States.

Stanford defeated Vanderbilt in the team final, 4–0, to claim their eleventh national title (and third in five years).

Host
This year's tournaments were hosted by Georgia Tech at the Bill Moore Tennis Center in Atlanta, Georgia.

The men's and women's NCAA tennis championships would not be held jointly until 2006.

See also
NCAA Division II Tennis Championships (Men, Women)
NCAA Division III Tennis Championships (Men, Women)

References

External links
List of NCAA Women's Tennis Champions

NCAA Division I tennis championships
NCAA Division I Women's Tennis Championships
NCAA Division I Women's Tennis Championships
NCAA Division I Women's Tennis Championships